The Myrtle Group is a geologic formation in Oregon. It preserves fossils dating back to the Cretaceous period.

See also

 List of fossiliferous stratigraphic units in Oregon
 Paleontology in Oregon

References
 

Cretaceous geology of Oregon
Jurassic geology of Oregon